The flag of Derbyshire is the flag of the English county of Derbyshire. Made up in 2006, the flag has subsequently been registered at the Flag Institute and added to their UK Flags Register.

History 
The creation of the flag came about as a result of a feature on Andy Whittaker's breakfast show on BBC Radio Derby in 2006. Jeremy Smith, a listener who had noticed the prominent use of Saint Piran's Flag while visiting Cornwall wanted to know whether Derbyshire had an equivalent symbol. As no flag to represent the county existed, a campaign to design one with the aid of listeners' suggestions was launched. The finished flag, designed by Martin Enright from Derby, was unveiled on 22 September 2006. Ceremonies to mark the first unfurling of the flag were held on the day  at various locations around the county, including Derby, Ripley, Ashbourne and Buxton.

Design 

The flag features a green cross on a blue background. These colours were chosen to represent Derbyshire's green countryside and its rivers and reservoirs, respectively. In the centre of the flag is a Tudor rose, which has been the county badge since the 15th century. The rose is gold in colour rather than the more usual red and white, partly to differentiate from the emblems of Yorkshire and Lancashire; it is also supposed to symbolise quality.

References

External links
 Picture gallery of flag launch ceremonies from BBC Derby website
[ The Flag Institute]

Derbyshire
Derbyshire
Derbyshire
Derbyshire
Derbyshire